Cyprinion watsoni, the Indus lotak, is a species of ray-finned fish in the genus Cyprinion. The original type specimen described as Cyprinion watsoni from the Indus and the populations elsewhere which are included by some authorities in C. watsoni are regarded by others as separate species Cypirion muscatensis from Oman and the United Arab Emirates and Cyprinion microphthalmum from Iran, Afghanistan and Pakistan.

Footnotes 

 

watsoni
Fish described in 1872